Tympanocryptis gigas, the Gascoyne pebble-mimic dragon, is a species of agama found in Australia.

References

gigas
Agamid lizards of Australia
Reptiles described in 1948
Taxa named by Francis John Mitchell